United Nations Security Council Resolution 1981, adopted unanimously on May 13, 2011, after recalling previous resolutions on the situation in Côte d'Ivoire (Ivory Coast), including resolutions 1933 (2010), 1942 (2010), 1946 (2010), 1951 (2010), 1962 (2010), 1967 (2011), 1968 (2011), 1975 (2011) and 1980 (2011), the Council extended the mandate of the United Nations Operation in Côte d'Ivoire (UNOCI) until July 31, 2011 and extended the temporary re-deployment of United Nations troops from Liberia until June 30, 2011.

The temporary deployment of units from Liberia would leave Côte d'Ivoire a month earlier than planned.

Resolution

Observations
In the preamble of the resolution, the Council recalled co-operation agreements between United Nations peacekeeping missions in Resolution 1609 (2005) and Resolution 1938 (2010) and its intention to deploy more troops from the United Nations Mission in Liberia (UNMIL) to UNOCI on a temporary basis if necessary.

Acts
The Council, acting under Chapter VII of the United Nations Charter, extended the mandate of UNOCI was renewed until July 31, 2011 and the temporary deployment of UNMIL troops was also extended until June 30, 2010. The temporary deployment consisted of three infantry companies, one aviation unit and three armed helicopters with crews.

Finally, the Secretary-General Ban Ki-moon was to report by the same date on his assessment of the UNOCI mission.

See also
 2010–2011 Ivorian crisis
 First Ivorian Civil War
 Ivorian parliamentary election, 2011
 Ivorian presidential election, 2010
 List of United Nations Security Council Resolutions 1901 to 2000 (2009–2011)
 Second Ivorian Civil War

References

External links
 
Text of the Resolution at undocs.org

 1981
2011 in Ivory Coast
 1981
May 2011 events